James Rickers (born 21 May 1974) is an English former television presenter, best known as the co-presenter of children's programmes Prove It!, Toonattik and Up On The Roof on CITV.

Career

Television
Rickers presented Up On The Roof between 2002 and 2005. In 2005, Rickers began presenting Toonattik on CITV. On 6 March 2010, it was announced GMTV children's presenters Anna Williamson and Rickers would be made redundant. Their last broadcast aired on 9 May 2010. Rickers and Williamson also presented a show on Nickelodeon titled ''Jamie & Anna's Big Weekend. 

When their stint on Nickelodeon came to an end, Rickers moved away from presenting to focus on pantomime. At one point he was also a consultant for global and foreign exchange client Vlopper, but resigned shortly before the Covid-19 Pandemic.

Filmography

Television

References

External links
 
 

British children's television presenters
GMTV presenters and reporters
British television presenters
Living people
1971 births